Los Feliz (Spanish for "The Feliz (family members)") is a hillside neighborhood in the greater Hollywood area of Los Angeles, California, abutting Hollywood and encompassing part of the Santa Monica Mountains. The neighborhood is named after the Feliz family of Californios who had owned the area since 1795, when José Vicente Feliz was granted Rancho Los Feliz.

History

Indigenous era
Long before the Spanish settlers arrived to settle near the banks of the Los Angeles River, Native Americans were the only inhabitants. It is estimated that the first Native Americans came to the area approximately 10,000 years ago. The Native Americans established villages, throughout the countryside. One of these settlements was within the boundaries of what was to become Rancho Los Feliz. Archeological surveys have found evidence of a substantial rancheria that existed in the mouth of Fern Dell Canyon in Griffith Park. The traditional name of this village is not known, but the inhabitants were Tongva. This name was given by the Spanish because of the Native Americans' association with the San Gabriel Mission.

Spanish and Mexican eras
When Gaspar de Portolà traveled through the vicinity in 1769, his expedition encountered members of this village.

The  Rancho Los Feliz, one of the first land grants in California, was granted to Corporal José Vicente Feliz. An old adobe house built in the 1830s by his heirs still stands on Crystal Springs Drive in Griffith Park. Other sections of the rancho were developed and became the communities of Los Feliz and Silver Lake.

Post-Conquest era

Following the American conquest of California, Rancho Los Feliz had a succession of owners after the Feliz family. The family first sold the rancho to noted statesman Antonio F. Coronel, before it passed to James Lick, whose estate sold the rancho to Griffith J. Griffith. Griffith donated over half of the ranch to the city of Los Angeles. This ranch became one of the largest city-owned parks in the country, Griffith Park.

In 1882, Colonel Griffith acquired  of Rancho Los Feliz. The Lick estate still owned the southwest portion of the rancho and there developed the Lick Tract, which later became a part of Hollywood. Griffith never served in any branch of the U.S. armed forces, but he was given the honorary title of colonel by influential friends in the California National Guard. The title remained a permanent fixture to his name.

Modern era

In 1900, there were only 23 properties in Los Feliz.

Griffith died on July 6, 1919, at the age of 67. Griffith bequeathed $700,000 and his Los Feliz acreage to the city of Los Angeles to be used for additions to Griffith Park.

On August 9, 1969, Manson and six others murdered supermarket executive Leno LaBianca and his wife Rosemary in their home located at 3301 Waverly Drive in Los Feliz, henceforth known as the Tate–LaBianca murders. 

After the fire, Los Angeles city officials pledged millions of dollars in aid to repair the damage.

Geography

Los Feliz encompasses several smaller but distinct areas, including the Los Feliz Hills and Los Feliz Estates (north of Los Feliz Boulevard), Laughlin Park, Los Feliz Village, Los Feliz Square, Los Feliz Knolls, and Franklin Hills.

According to the Mapping L.A. project of the Los Angeles Times, Los Feliz is part of central Los Angeles. It is flanked on the north by Griffith Park, on the northeast by Atwater Village, on the southeast by Silver Lake, on the south by East Hollywood, and on the northwest by Hollywood and Hollywood Hills. Los Feliz is situated near the 101 and the 5 freeways in Hollywood and Atwater Village respectively. The neighborhood's boundaries (as used by Mapping L.A.) are the Griffith Park line between Fern Dell Drive and Riverside Drive on the north; the Los Angeles River on the east; Hyperion Avenue and Griffith Park Boulevard on the southeast; Fountain Avenue and Hollywood Boulevard on the south; and Western Avenue, Los Feliz Boulevard, and Fern Dell Drive on the west and northwest. The boundaries of the Los Feliz Improvement Association extend further west to Canyon Drive.

Los Feliz experiences a hot-summer Mediterranean climate (Csa), just like most of Central Los Angeles.

Demographics

The 2000 U.S. census counted 35,238 residents in the 2.61-square-mile neighborhood—an average of 13,512 people per square mile, among the highest population densities in Los Angeles County. In 2008 the city estimated that the population had increased to 36,933. The median age for residents was 36, older than in the city as a whole; the percentage of residents aged 65 and older was among the county's highest.

The neighborhood was highly diverse ethnically. The breakdown was whites, 57.6%; Latinos, 18.7%; Asians, 13.5%; blacks, 3.7%, and others, 6.6%. Armenia (25.3%) and Mexico (9.4%) were the most common places of birth for the 44.5% of the residents who were born abroad, a high ratio compared to the rest of Los Angeles.

The median yearly household income in 2008 dollars was $50,793, about the same as the rest of Los Angeles, but a high rate of households earned $20,000 or less per year. The average household size of two people was low for the city of Los Angeles. Renters occupied 75.5% of the housing stock, and house or apartment owners the rest.

The percentages of never-married men (50.2%) and never-married women (37.2%) were among the county's highest, as was the percentage of widowed women (10.1%).

Communities

The Los Feliz Neighborhood Council is divided into five interest areas, which include the following communities:
 District A: Los Feliz Hills and Los Feliz Estates
 District B: Los Feliz Square, Laughlin Park, and Thai Town North
 District C: Los Feliz Village
 District D: Los Feliz Knolls and Waverly Heights
 District E: Franklin Hills and a few neighboring blocks

The Oaks, a hilly neighborhood on the west side of Los Feliz bordering Griffith Park, is part of the Hollywood United Neighborhood Council. It is, however, within the boundaries of the Los Feliz Improvement Association.

Los Feliz Hills

The area north of Los Feliz Boulevard below Griffith Park is commonly referred to as the Los Feliz Hills. The Los Feliz Hills contain multimillion-dollar homes and have been known for the large share of their inhabitants being involved in creative pursuits. The mean household income is $196,585.

The original subdivision of Los Feliz Heights was subdivided in 1921, from Los Feliz Boulevard north to Griffith Park, from Catalina to Vermont. The Los Feliz Heights Residential Historic District is significant for Period Revival architecture (including American Colonial, Spanish Colonial, Mediterranean, and Tudor Revival styles) from 1920 to 1949. The original subdivision of Hillhurst Park was between Los Feliz Boulevard and Griffith Park, from Vermont Avenue to Commonwealth Avenue. The original subdivision of Los Feliz Hills was to the east, abutting Riverside Drive, Los Feliz Boulevard, and Griffith Park.

Laughlin Park

The gated community of Laughlin Park has 60 houses. In 1998, Laura Meyers of Los Angeles Magazine described the area as "The most seductive, exclusive neighborhood in Los Feliz". W.C. Fields lived here in an Italianate residence built in 1919.

Los Feliz Village
Los Feliz Village is the southern section of Los Feliz, home to most of the commercial storefronts in the district. It is centered on the thoroughfares of Vermont and Hillhurst Avenues and spans from approximately Prospect Avenue to Los Feliz Boulevard. There are several coffee shops, restaurants, and small clothing and vintage stores.

Los Feliz Village Business Improvement District helps promote local businesses and has an annual street fair.

In February 2014, a local shop called Dumb Starbucks was opened as a bit for the Comedy Central show Nathan for You in Los Feliz Village. It has gained notoriety as a parody of Starbucks.

Education

Forty-two percent of Los Feliz residents aged 25 and older had earned a four-year degree in 2000, a high figure for the city.

The schools within Los Feliz are as follows:
 John Marshall Senior High School, LAUSD, 3939 Tracy Street. Designed by architect George M. Lindsey in the Collegiate Gothic style, the school opened on January 26, 1931. After the Sylmar earthquake of 1971, some of Marshall's buildings were condemned. The cafeteria was torn down, but the Main Building was preserved. In 1975, it was closed for structural strengthening, and in September 1981 it was reopened. Mike Haynes Stadium, the school's football and track arena, dates to 1981 and was renovated with a regulation Olympic track and new turf field in 2010.
 Franklin Avenue Elementary School, LAUSD, 1910 North Commonwealth Avenue
 Los Feliz Elementary School, LAUSD, 1740 North New Hampshire Avenue
 Thomas Starr King Middle School, LAUSD, 4201 Fountain Avenue
 Our Mother of Good Counsel, private elementary, 4622 Ambrose Avenue
 Lycée International de Los Angeles Los Feliz campus, private elementary

In 1998, Laura Meyers of the Los Angeles Times said that residents of the Laughlin Park section of Los Feliz "tend not to send their kids to the local public schools" and instead "often" select the Lycée International or the Oaks School.

The Immaculate Heart school is in close proximity to the community.

In popular culture

Buena Vista Street, the entrance to the California Adventure theme park at the Disneyland Resort, is partly modeled after Los Feliz in the 1920s and 1930s. The Disney Buena Vista Street includes a retail location called Los Feliz Five and Dime. Disney's Hyperion studio was situated in the Los Feliz area where a Gelson's Market now stands.

Several scenes in Double Indemnity are set in the Los Feliz area.

In J.G. Quintel's series Close Enough, the main characters live in Los Feliz.

The neighborhood is the subject of the 2015 Mark Ronson song "Leaving Los Feliz" from the album Uptown Special.

In Swingers, the main characters discuss their personal lives while playing at golf at Los Feliz 9-hole, par 3 golf course.

In the song "Quiet On Set" by Remi Wolf, the singer quotes 'Wait, ain't no Chuck E. Cheese in Los Feliz', which as of January 2023, is correct.

See also
 List of people from Los Feliz, Los Angeles
 Los Angeles Historic-Cultural Monuments in Hollywood and Los Feliz

References

External links

 Los Feliz Improvement Association (LFIA) | www.lfia.org
Los Feliz Ledger | www.losfelizledger.com
City of Los Angeles | Los Feliz Neighborhood Council; certified neighborhood council #35
 Comments about living in Los Feliz
 Los Feliz crime map and statistics
 Los Feliz Today
 Los Feliz Village Online; Los Feliz Village Business Improvement District (LFVBID)
 Los Feliz Branch Library

 
Central Los Angeles
Neighborhoods in Los Angeles
Northwest Los Angeles
Populated places in the Santa Monica Mountains